Yiridougou is a commune in the Cercle of Bougouni in the Sikasso Region of southern Mali. The principal town lies at Ouroumpana. In 1998 the commune had a population of 5,992.

References

Communes of Sikasso Region